Hans Lampe (born 28 June 1948) is a German former swimmer who competed in the 1972 Summer Olympics. He was born in Hannover and is the brother of Werner Lampe, another successful swimmer.

References

External links

1948 births
Living people
German male swimmers
German male butterfly swimmers
Olympic swimmers of West Germany
Swimmers at the 1972 Summer Olympics
European Aquatics Championships medalists in swimming
Sportspeople from Hanover